The traditional star name Albulaan refers to two stars in the Aquarius constellation:
 μ Aquarii
 ν Aquarii

The name derives from the Arabic term, al-bulaʽān (ألبولعان) meaning "the two swallowers".